Ange Lou Armato (born October 27, 1929) is an American former infielder who played in the All-American Girls Professional Baseball League.

Born in Rockford, Illinois, Ange Armato was the seventh girl out of eight children from a large Italian family. In high school, her career dream was to be an artist, so her parents sent her to art school. During that period of time, Armato went to her first baseball game and she was hooked. She then practiced with the Rockford Peaches for three years and went to school in Chicago. In the process, Armato signed a contract and joined the Peaches in 1949, but due to an injury, she was unable to complete the season.

In 1953 Armato returned to the league and was assigned to the Kalamazoo Lassies. She only had two hits in 26 at-bats for a .077 average, but was a sure-handed fielder at second base. Kalamazoo ended the season in third place with a 56–50 record and defeated the Fort Wayne Daisies in the first round, two to one games, but lost to the Grand Rapids Chicks in the final series in just two games.

Since 1988 Armato is part of Women in Baseball, a permanent display based at the Baseball Hall of Fame and Museum in Cooperstown, New York, which was unveiled to honor the entire All-American Girls Professional Baseball League rather than individual baseball personalities.

In 1991, Armato appeared briefly in the film A League of Their Own as part of the AAGPBL veterans reunited in Cooperstown during the shooting of the film, playing at shortstop for the blue team.

Ange Armato currently lives in Lehigh Acres, Florida, where she enjoys traveling, golf, bowling and watching baseball and basketball.

Sources

All-American Girls Professional Baseball League players
Baseball second basemen
Baseball players from Illinois
American people of Italian descent
Sportspeople from Rockford, Illinois
1929 births
Living people
People from Lee County, Florida
Rockford Peaches players
Kalamazoo Lassies players
21st-century American women